Minusinsk Basin or Khakass-Minusinsk Basin (Minusinskaya (Chakassko-Minusinskaya) kotlovina) is in Khakassia and Krasnoyarsk Krai, Russia located among mountains of South Siberia.

Geography 

It is bounded on the west by Kuznetsk Alatau, and east by the Sayan Mountains. See Geography of South-Central Siberia. Elevation varies between 200–700 m, constituting a plain with sparse hillocks and cut by valleys.

The Yenisey River and its major tributaries Abakan,  Oia (Russian: Оя ) and Tuba flow through the valley. Its major towns are Minusinsk and Abakan. The hollow has a large number of lakes, including saltwater ones. The depression is an important agricultural area; it also has coal deposits (Minusinsk Coal Basin).

References

Depressions of Russia
Landforms of Khakassia
Geography of Siberia
Geography of Central Asia
Landforms of Krasnoyarsk Krai